Bobby Arora (born January 1972) is a British billionaire businessman, trading director of the retail chain B&M.

Early life
Bobby was born to an Arora family in January 1972.

Career
In 1995, he went into business with his brother Simon Arora, and founded Orient Sourcing Services, importing homewares from Asia and supplying them to UK retail chains, before buying B&M in 2004, which was then a struggling grocery chain based in Blackpool. He has been trading director of B&M since 2005.

Jointly with his brothers Simon and Robin, they have made £2.1-billion since taking over the Blackpool-based grocery chain in 2004. Their earnings soared during the COVID-19 pandemic.

Personal life
Simon describes his brother Bobby as a "born trader".

References

1972 births
Living people
British businesspeople
British billionaires